Rudy is a town in Crawford County, Arkansas, United States. It is part of the Fort Smith, Arkansas-Oklahoma Metropolitan Statistical Area. As of the 2010 Census the population was 61. The population was 72 at the 2000 census.

History
Rudy was platted when the St. Louis–San Francisco Railway was extended to that point. A post office called Rudy has been in operation since 1883.

Geography
Rudy is located at  (35.527733, -94.271583).

Demographics

As of the census of 2000, there were 72 people, 27 households, and 22 families residing in the town. The population density was 463.3/km (1,251.4/mi2). There were 30 housing units at an average density of 193.1/km (521.4/mi2). The racial makeup of the town was 95.83% White and 4.17% Native American. 1.39% of the population were Hispanic or Latino of any race.

There were 27 households, out of which 37.0% had children under the age of 18 living with them, 63.0% were married couples living together, 11.1% had a female householder with no husband present, and 18.5% were non-families. 14.8% of all households were made up of individuals, and 14.8% had someone living alone who was 65 years of age or older. The average household size was 2.67 and the average family size was 2.86.

In the town, the population was spread out, with 30.6% under the age of 18, 5.6% from 18 to 24, 26.4% from 25 to 44, 12.5% from 45 to 64, and 25.0% who were 65 years of age or older. The median age was 38 years. For every 100 females, there were 94.6 males. For every 100 females age 18 and over, there were 100.0 males.

The median income for a household in the town was $21,875, and the median income for a family was $26,250. Males had a median income of $21,250 versus $13,750 for females. The per capita income for the town was $11,842. There were 20.0% of families and 19.2% of the population living below the poverty line, including 16.7% of under eighteens and 25.0% of those over 64.

References

Towns in Crawford County, Arkansas
Towns in Arkansas
Fort Smith metropolitan area